Kowloon Reception Reservoir, part of the Kowloon Group of Reservoirs, is a reservoir in Kam Shan Country Park, Sha Tin, New Territories, Hong Kong.

The Kowloon Reception Reservoir Jogging Trail, a circular route measuring 1.6 km long, surrounds the reservoir.

Its dam and the valve house built at the centre of the dam are listed as Grade I historic buildings.

History
Originally known as Eption Reservoir, it was built in 1926 to receive the fresh water from Shing Mun Reservoir and then sent to the Shek Lei Pui Water Treatment Works for filtration.

See also
List of reservoirs of Hong Kong
Kowloon Group of Reservoirs
Kowloon Reservoir
Shek Lei Pui Reservoir

References

External links
Reservoirs of Hong Kong (1) Hong Kong and Kowloon (in Chinese)

Buildings and structures completed in 1926
Kowloon Group of Reservoirs